Keck is a German surname.

Geographical distribution
As of 2014, 49.6% of all known bearers of the surname Keck were residents of the United States (frequency 1:23,396), 41.2% of Germany (1:6,259), 1.8% of France (1:115,665), 1.6% of Austria (1:16,894), 1.5% of Canada (1:79,996) and 1.3% of Australia (1:60,648).

In Germany, the frequency of the surname was higher than national average (1:5,708) in the following states:
 1. Baden-Württemberg (1:2,036)
 2. Bavaria (1:4,104)
 3. Rhineland-Palatinate (1:5,232)

People
 Anthony Keck, English architect
 Bobby Keck, American NASCAR driver
 Charles Keck (1875–1951), American sculptor
 David D. Keck (1903–1995), American botanist
 Donald Keck (born 1941), American physicist
 Fred Keck (1854–1913), American farmer and politician
 Gary Keck, American chemist
 Hermann Keck, inventor of the Keck clip
 Howard B. Keck (1913–1996), son and successor of W. M. Keck
 James M. Keck (1921–2018), United States military officer
 Jean-Christophe Keck (born 1964), French musician and editor of the critical edition of the works of Jacques Offenbach
 Jeremiah Keck (1845–1930), American politician
 Kevin Keck (born 1973), American essayist and poet
 Philip Keck (1848-1911), American judge, lawyer, and politician
 Rebecca J. Keck (1827–1904), American physician and patent medicine entrepreneur
 Stan Keck (1897–1951), American football player
 Tara Keck (born 1978), American-British neuroscientist
 Tim Keck (born 1967), American newspaper publisher
 Tinker Keck (born 1976), American sportsman
 William Myron Keck (1880–1964), American founder of Superior Oil Company, created the W. M. Keck Foundation

References

German-language surnames